Din of Ecstasy is the second studio album by singer-songwriter and guitarist, Chris Whitley. It was released on Columbia Records in 1995.

It was produced primarily by John Custer and Chris Whitley. The album was recorded by Steve Melton (assisted by Danny Kadar and Kent Bruce) and mixed by Toby Wright at Muscle Shoals Sound in Sheffield, Alabama as well as Baby Monster, Sony Music Studios, and Electric Lady Studios in New York City.

In 2014 Danny Kadar published an alternative version of the album on SoundCloud without the additional effects in the official version.

Track listing
All tracks written by Chris Whitley unless otherwise noted.

 "Narcotic Prayer" – 3:45
 "Never" – 2:48
 "Know" – 3:47
 "O God My Heart Is Ready" – 3:13
 "Can't Get Off" – 4:03
 "God Thing" – 4:49
 "Din" – 3:15
 "New Machine" – 3:18
 "Some Candy Talking" (Jim Reid and William Reid – The Jesus and Mary Chain) – 4:13
 "Guns & Dolls" – 3:30
 "WPL" – 3:09
 "Ultraglide"
 "Days of Obligation" (hidden track) – 7:41

"O God My Heart Is Ready" and "Din" were released as singles.

Personnel 
Chris Whitley – vocals and guitars
Dougie Bowne – drums, percussion, and co-production (9)
Alan Gevaert – bass, bass pedals, and low end noise

Additional personnel
Andy Rosen – Mellotron (1)
Dan Whitley – lead guitar (4)
Louis Lepore – lead guitar (13)

References

1995 albums
Chris Whitley albums
Work Records albums
Columbia Records albums